Mark Steven Carreon (born July 19, 1963) is an American former first baseman and outfielder in Major League Baseball. He was selected by the New York Mets in the 8th round of the 1981 draft out of Salpointe Catholic High School.

Career
He made his major league debut on September 8, 1987. From 1987 through 1996, he played for the New York Mets (1987–1991), Detroit Tigers (1992), San Francisco Giants (1993–1996) and Cleveland Indians (1996). He also played two seasons in Japan for the Chiba Lotte Marines in 1997 and 1998. Mark is the son of former major league catcher Cam Carreon.

In a 10-season career, Carreon was a .277 hitter (557-for-2012) with 69 home runs and 289 runs batted in (RBI) in 738 games played. Defensively, he recorded a .987 fielding percentage playing at all three outfield positions and first base. Carreon was a rarity, in that he threw left-handed but batted right-handed, as a non-pitcher.

Carreon has the most pinch-hit home runs for the New York Mets with eight. As a member of the Giants, he won the 1995 Willie Mac Award honoring his spirit. He was traded from the Giants to the Indians for Jim Poole and cash on July 9, . He was batting .260 with 22 doubles, three triples, nine homers and 51 RBI at the time of the transaction. The Indians addressed a need for an additional first baseman, a position of which the Giants had a surplus.

Carreon finished his career with the Jackson DiamondKats of the Texas–Louisiana League.

Carreon spent two years playing pro ball in Japan for the Chiba Lotte Marines, after the 1996 season.

Late in 1999, Carreon was reported as missing by his mother, but was later found safe.

On December 13, 2007, Carreon was named in the Mitchell Report to the Commissioner of Baseball of an Independent Investigation Into the Illegal Use of Steroids and Other Performance Enhancing Substances by Players in Major League Baseball.

See also
 List of second-generation Major League Baseball players
 List of Major League Baseball players named in the Mitchell Report

References

External links
, or  Baseball Library, or  Retrosheet, or Baseball Reference (Minor, Japanese and Independent Leagues), or Pura Pelota (Venezuelan Winter League)

1963 births
Living people
American expatriate baseball players in Japan
Baseball players from Chicago
Chiba Lotte Marines players
Cleveland Indians players
Detroit Tigers players
Jackson DiamondKats players
Jackson Mets players
Kingsport Mets players
Lynchburg Mets players
Major League Baseball first basemen
Major League Baseball outfielders
Navegantes del Magallanes players
American expatriate baseball players in Venezuela
New York Mets players
San Francisco Giants players
Shelby Mets players
Tidewater Tides players